The following is a list of bands that either were, are or have been associated with the genre crossover thrash.

References 

Lists of extreme heavy metal bands
Crossover thrash groups
Lists of hardcore punk bands